Jaak Jõerüüt (born 9 December 1947 in Tallinn) is an Estonian writer and politician. He was the defense minister of Estonia from November 2004 to 10 October 2005.

Jõerüüt first came to political prominence when he became one of the voters for the Estonian restoration of Independence. He was then appointed to be Minister of Defence in November 2004 in Juhan Parts's government. When Parts resigned in April 2005, Jaak Jõerüüt was one of the few ministers retained in Andrus Ansip's government.

In September 2005, Jõerüüt resigned voluntarily over the so-called "T-Shirt Affair". (A T-shirt was produced with a list of the names of several Estonian politicians, including Jõerüüt, who are former members of the communist party; it was headed "Commies into the Oven!") At a soccer match, this was worn by several people who were in the employment of his ministry. Jõerüüt was succeeded by Jürgen Ligi.

Jõerüüt previously served as Estonia's ambassador to the United Nations in 2004. He served as ambassador to Italy and Malta from 1998 through 2002, and ambassador to Cyprus from 1999 through 2004. From 1993 to 1997, Jõerüüt was ambassador to Finland and from 2006 to 2010 to Latvia and now to Sweden from 2011 to 2014.

References

External links

 Official biography

Estonian non-fiction writers
1947 births
Living people
Politicians from Tallinn
Writers from Tallinn
Defence Ministers of Estonia
Permanent Representatives of Estonia to the United Nations
Ambassadors of Estonia to Italy
Ambassadors of Estonia to Malta
Ambassadors of Estonia to Cyprus
Ambassadors of Estonia to Finland
Ambassadors of Estonia to Latvia
Ambassadors of Estonia to Sweden
Recipients of the Order of the National Coat of Arms, 3rd Class
Recipients of the Order of the National Coat of Arms, 4th Class
Voters of the Estonian restoration of Independence
Tallinn University of Technology alumni
20th-century Estonian politicians
21st-century Estonian politicians
20th-century Estonian writers
21st-century Estonian writers